Fyodor Dmitriyevich Urnov (born 1968) is Russian-born biomedical researcher and who has played a leading role in the field of genome editing. He is a Professor of Genetics, Genomics, and Development at the University of California, Berkeley and Director of the Center for Translational Genomics at the university's Innovative Genomics Institute. In 2005 Urnov and his colleagues coined the term "genome editing" and demonstrated the first use of ZFNs to edit DNA in human cells. Urnov is considered a pioneering figure in the field of genome editing and his work has been cited widely.

Early life and education 
Fyodor Urnov was born in Soviet Russia to a linguist mother and a literary critic father. He was raised in Moscow. Urnov's father frequently purchased him books; on his 12th birthday, Urnov received a copy of James D. Watson's book The Double Helix. The book helped to spark Urnov's early interest in life sciences.

Urnov attended Moscow State University, where he received his undergraduate degree in biology in 1990. Following the fall of the Iron Curtain, Urnov applied to graduate schools in the United States. He attended Brown University for doctoral studies where he worked as a researcher in the laboratory of Susan Gerbi. He received his Ph.D. from Brown in 1996.

Career 
After graduating, Urnov worked with DNA in the laboratory of Alan Wolffe at the National Institutes of Health. In 2000, Urnov followed Wolffe to Sangamo Therapeutics where he had been recruited as Chief Scientific Officer. Shortly after moving to the San Francisco Bay Area, Urnov was offered an adjunct position as a lecturer at the University of California, Berkeley.

In 2005 Urnov's team at Sangamo demonstrated the first use of ZFNs to edit DNA in human cells and coined the term "genome editing."

In 2019 Urnov joined UC Berkeley as Professor of Genetics, Genomics, and Development and Director of the Center for Translational Genomics at the Innovative Genomics Institute.

References

External links 
 

Living people
Genome editing
History of biotechnology
Scientists from Moscow
Moscow State University alumni
Brown University alumni
University of California, Berkeley College of Letters and Science faculty
1968 births